Takehara Dam  is a gravity dam located in Hyogo Prefecture in Japan. The dam is used for water supply. The catchment area of the dam is 4.7 km2. The dam impounds about 10  ha of land when full and can store 804 thousand cubic meters of water. The construction of the dam was started on 1959 and completed in 1962.

See also
List of dams in Japan

References

Dams in Hyogo Prefecture